Lida Peyton "Eliza" Pollock (October 24, 1840 – May 25, 1919) was an American archer who competed in the early twentieth century. She won two bronze medals in Archery at the 1904 Summer Olympics in Missouri in the double national and Columbia rounds and a gold medal with the US team. She was born in Hamilton, Ohio and died in Wyoming, Ohio. She is the oldest woman ever to win an Olympic Gold. She was aged 63 years and 333 days when she won gold.

References

External links
 

1840 births
1919 deaths
Sportspeople from Hamilton, Ohio
American female archers
Olympic bronze medalists for the United States in archery
Olympic gold medalists for the United States in archery
Archers at the 1904 Summer Olympics
Medalists at the 1904 Summer Olympics